This is a list of Superleague Formula drivers and teams, that is, a list of all those who have made at least one race start in Superleague Formula. This list is accurate up to and including the final round of the 2010 championship at Navarra.

Drivers
A total of 57 different drivers have raced at least once in Superleague Formula with seven of them having also had Formula One race experience. Drivers of eighteen different nationalities have competed in the series. There have been several British, French and Spanish drivers, while drivers from countries such as Greece, China, New Zealand and the United Arab Emirates have also earned race weekends. Craig Dolby is the only driver to have started all 48 main races in the series since the inaugural race in 2008.

NOTE – not including any Race 3 results (applies to Magny-Cours, Donington Park, Estoril and Jarama in 2009 and every race in 2010).

By nationality

Racing teams

 Team West-Tec (in 2008) and Durango (in 2010) only managed cars during pre-season and never actually entered a race.

NOTE – not including any Race 3 results (applies to Magny-Cours, Donington Park, Estoril and Jarama in 2009 and every race in 2010).

References

External links
 Superleague Formula Official Website
 V12 Racing: Independent Superleague Formula Fansite Magazine

 

Drivers and teams